Andrew J. Hoffman (born 1961) is a scholar of environmental issues and sustainable enterprise. He is the Holcim (US) Professor of Sustainable Enterprise at the University of Michigan's Ross School of Business and School for Environment and Sustainability (SEAS). His research uses a sociological perspective to understand the cultural and institutional aspects of environmental issues for organizations.  In particular, he focuses on the processes by which environmental issues both emerge and evolve as social, political and managerial issues. He has written extensively about: the evolving nature of field level pressures related to environmental issues; the corporate responses that have emerged as a result of those pressures, particularly around the issue of climate change; the interconnected networks among non-governmental organizations and corporations and how those networks influence change processes within cultural and institutional systems; the social and psychological barriers to these change processes; and the underlying cultural values that are engaged when these barriers are overcome. His Ph.D. was conferred by the Massachusetts Institute of Technology in 1995. He is an expert in environmental pollution and has published eighteen books and over one-hundred articles and book chapters.

The Organizations & Natural Environment Division of the Academy of Management awarded him with the Best Teaching Award in 2020 and the Distinguished Scholar Award in 2018. The Social Issues in Management Division of the Academy of Management, awarded (with Dev Jennings) the Best Book Award for Re-engaging with Sustainability in the Anthropocene Era. The Aspen Institute selected Professor Hoffman to receive their Faculty Pioneer Award in 2016. He was the Grand Prize winner of the 2019 Alfred N. and Lynn Manos Page Prize for Sustainability Issues in Business Curricula for the course: Business In Democracy: Advocacy, Lobbying and the Public Interest, and again the 2009 Alfred N. and Lynn Manos Page Prize for the course: Green Construction & Design. And he was selected for the 2011 Aldo Leopold Fellowship, the 2011 and 2009 Aspen Environmental Fellowship, and the 1995 Klegerman Award.  His work has been covered in numerous media outlets, including the New York Times, Scientific American, Time, the Wall Street Journal, the Atlantic, and National Public Radio. His book From Heresy to Dogma: An Institutional History of Corporate Environmentalism was selected as winner of the 2001 Rachel Carson Prize from the Society for Social Studies of Science. His book Builder's Apprentice was selected as the winner of the 2011 Connecticut Book Award. His article "Climate science as culture war," won the 2013 Maggie Prize.

Early life and career 
He grew up in Norwood Massachusetts, earned his BS in Chemical Engineering from the University of Massachusetts at Amherst, his MS in Civil & Environmental Engineering from MIT, and his PhD in both Management and Civil & Environmental Engineering from MIT.

Books:
 Management as a Calling: Leading Business, Serving Society, Stanford University Press, 2021.
 The Engaged Scholar: Expanding the Impact of Academic Research in Today's World, Stanford University Press, 2021.
 Re-engaging with Sustainability in the Anthropocene Era: An Institutional Approach, with P. Devereaux Jennings, Cambridge University Press, 2018.
 Business and the Natural Environment: A Research Overview, with Susse Georg, Routledge, 2018.
 Finding Purpose: Environmental Stewardship as a Personal Calling, Greenleaf Publishing, 2016.
 Academic Engagement in Public and Political Discourse, Michigan Publishing, 2015.
 How Culture Shapes the Climate Change Debate, Stanford University Press, 2015. Translated into Czech (Jak kultura utváří diskusi o klimatické změně, Muni Press).
 Flourishing: A Frank Conversation About Sustainability, with John Ehrenfeld, Stanford University Press, 2013.
 Constructing Green: The Social Structures of Sustainability, (coeditor) with Rebecca Henn, MIT Press, 2013.
 Business and the Environment: Critical Perspectives in Business and Management, (coeditor) with Susse Georg, Routledge, 2012.
 The Oxford Handbook on Business and the Natural Environment, (coeditor) with Tima Bansal, Oxford University Press, 2012.
 Builder's Apprentice: A Memoir, Huron River Press, 2010.
 Memo to the CEO: Climate Change, What’s Your Business Strategy?, with John Woody, Harvard Business Press, 2008. Translated into Chinese (必看！绿色战略中的商机, China Machine Press), Danish (Klimaforandring - Hvad er din forretningsstrategi?, Gyldendal), and Portuguese (Mudanças Climáticas: Desafios e Oportunidades Empresariais, Elsevier and Alterações Climáticas, Actual Editoras).
 Carbon Strategies: How Leading Companies are Reducing their Climate Change Footprint, University of Michigan Press, 2007. Translated into Korean (십년 후 기업의 순위를 뒤바꿀 탄소전략, Tendedero).
 Organizations, Policy, and the Natural Environment, (coeditor) with Marc Ventresca, Stanford University Press, 2002.
 From Heresy to Dogma: An Institutional History of Corporate Environmentalism, Stanford University Press, 2001.
 Competitive Environmental Strategy: A Guide to the Changing Landscape, Island Press, 2000.
 Global Climate Change: A Senior-Level Dialogue, (editor); New Lexington Press, 1998.

Selected Articles:
 Hoffman, A., and P.D. Jennings (2021) “Institutional-political scenarios for Anthropocene society,” Business & Society, 60(1): 57–94.
 Hoffman, A. (2020) “Business education as if people and the planet really matter,” Strategic Organization. doi.org/10.1177/1476127020967638
 Ergene, S., B. Banerjee and A. Hoffman (2020) “(Un)sustainability and organization studies: Towards a radical engagement,” Organization Studies, doi.org/10.1177/0170840620937892
 Jennings, P.D. and A. Hoffman (2019) “Three paradoxes of climate truth for the Anthropocene social scientist,” Organization & Environment, doi.org/10.1177/1086026619858857.
 Elangovan, A.R. and A. Hoffman (2019) “The pursuit of success in academia: Plato’s ghost asks ‘What then?’” Journal of Management Inquiry, doi.org/10.1177/1056492619836729
 Hoffman, A. (2019) “Climate change and our emerging cultural shift,” Behavioral Scientist, September 30.
 Hoffman, A. (2018) “Management as a calling,” Stanford Social Innovation Review, September 4.
 Hoffman, A. (2018) “The next phase of business sustainability,” Stanford Social Innovation Review, 16(2): 34-39.
 Hoffman, A. (2017) “In praise of ‘B’ journals: Academic publishing is becoming more about establishing a pecking order and less about pursuing knowledge,” Inside Higher Education. March 27. 
 Schifeling, T. and A. Hoffman (2017) “Bill McKibben’s influence on U.S. climate change discourse: Shifting field-level debates through radical flank effects” Organization & Environment, DOI: 10.1177/1086026617744278
 Hoffman, A. (2015) "Reflections: Academia's emerging crisis of relevance and the consequent role of the engaged scholar," Journal of Change Management, DOI:10.1080/14697017.2015.1128168
 Hoffman, A. C. Corbett, N. Joglekar and P. Wells (2014) “Industrial ecology as a source of competitive advantage,” Journal of Industrial Ecology. DOI: 10.1111/jiec.12196
 Bertels, S., A. Hoffman, A. and R. DeJordy (2014) “The varied work of challenger movements: Identifying challenger roles in the U.S. environmental movement,” Organization Studies, 35(8): 1171-1210
 Haigh, N. and A. Hoffman (2014) “The new heretics: Hybrid organizations and the challenges they present to corporate sustainability,” Organization & Environment, 27(3): 223-241.
 Walls, J. and A. Hoffman (2012) “Exceptional boards: Environmental experience and positive deviance from institutional norms,” Journal of Organizational Behavior, DOI: 10.1002/job.1813
 Hoffman, A. (2013) “Academic engagement in public and political discourse: Establishing the rules of the game,” Michigan Journal of Sustainability, 1(1): 5-13.
 Hoffman, A. (2012) “Climate science as culture war,” Stanford Social Innovation Review, 10(4): 30-3
 Hoffman, A. and P.D. Jennings (2012) “The social and psychological foundations of climate change,” Solutions, 4(3) (July).  
 Haigh, N. and A. Hoffman (2012) “Hybrid organizations: The next chapter in sustainable business,” Organizational Dynamics, 41(2): 126-134
 Hoffman, A. (2011) “Talking past each other? Cultural framing of skeptical and convinced logics in the climate change debate.” Organization & Environment, 24 (1): 3-33.
 Hoffman, A. and P.D. Jennings (2011) “The BP oil spill as a cultural anomaly? Institutional context, conflict and change,” Journal of Management Inquiry. 20 (2): 100-112. Winner of JMI’s 2011 Breaking the Frame Best Paper Award
 Hoffman, A. (2011) “The culture and discourse of climate skepticism,” Strategic Organization, 9(1): 77-84.
 Hoffman, A. (2010) “Climate change as a cultural and behavioral issue: Addressing barriers and implementing solutions,” Organizational Dynamics, 39 (4): 295-305.
 Hoffman, A. (2011) “The growing climate divide,” Nature Climate Change, 1(4): 195-196
 Hoffman, A. (2010) “Reconciling professional and personal value systems: The spiritually motivated manager as organizational entrepreneur,” in R. Giacalone & C. Jurkiewicz (eds) 2nd edition, The Handbook of Workplace Spirituality and Organizational Performance (New York: M.E. Sharpe): 155-170.
 Hoffman, A. and S. Bertels (2010) “Who is part of the environmental movement? Assessing network linkages between NGOs and corporations” in T. Lyon (ed). Good Cop Bad Cop: Environmental NGOs and their Strategies toward Business (Washington DC: Resources for the Future Press): 48-69.
 Hoffman, A. (2009) “Shades of green,” Stanford Social Innovation Review, Spring: 40-49.
 Hoffman, A. and R. Henn (2008) “Overcoming the social and psychological barriers to green building,” Organization & Environment, 21(4): 390-419.
 Sandelands, L. and A. Hoffman (2008) “Sustainability, faith and the market,” Worldviews: Global Religions, Culture and Ecology, 12: 129-145.
 Hoffman, A. (2007) “If you’re not at the table, you’re on the menu,” Harvard Business Review, October: 34-35.
 Hoffman, A. (2006) “Let’s put Malcolm Gladwell out of business,” Journal of Management Inquiry, 15 (4): 410-411.
 Hoffman, A. and L. Sandelands (2005) “Getting right with nature: Anthropocentism, ecocentrism and theocentrism,” Organization & Environment, 18 (2): 141-162.
 Hoffman, A. (2005) “Climate change strategy: The business logic behind voluntary greenhouse gas reductions,” California Management Review, 47 (3): 21-46.
 Hoffman, A. (2004) “Winning the greenhouse gas game,” Harvard Business Review, April: 20-21.
 Hoffman, A. (2004) “Reconsidering the role of the practical-theorist: On (re)connecting theory to practice in organizational theory,” Strategic Organization, 2 (2): 213-222.
 Howard-Grenville, J. and A. Hoffman (2003) “The importance of cultural framing to the success of social initiatives in business,” Academy of Management Executive, 17 (2): 70-84.
 Wade-Benzoni, K., A. Hoffman, L. Thompson, D. Moore, J. Gillespie and M. Bazerman (2002) “Barriers to resolution in ideologically based negotiations: The role of values and institutions,” Academy of Management Review, 27 (1): 41-57. Finalist for AMR’s 2002 Best Paper of the Year Award.
 Hoffman, A. and W. Ocasio (2001) “Not all events are attended equally: Toward a middle-range theory of industry attention to external events,” Organization Science, 12 (4): 414-434.
 Hoffman, A. (2001) “Linking organizational and field level analyses: The diffusion of corporate environmental practice,” Organization & Environment, 14(2): 133-156.
 Hoffman, A. (1999) “Institutional evolution and change: Environmentalism and the US chemical industry,” Academy of Management Journal, 42(4): 351-371.
 Hoffman, A. and M. Ventresca (1999) “The institutional framing of policy debates: Economics versus the environment,” American Behavioral Scientist, 42(8): 1368-1392.
 Bazerman, M. and A. Hoffman (1999) “Sources of environmentally destructive behavior:  Individual, organizational and institutional perspectives,” Research in Organizational Behavior, 21: 39-79.

References

External links
 University of Michigan bio
 "Saving the World at Business School - A conversation with Andrew Hoffman", Ideas Roadshow, 2013
 "Saving Place, Saving Grace", PBS Documentary, 2017

1961 births
Living people
Ross School of Business faculty
Massachusetts Institute of Technology alumni